Elaine Nekritz (born December 11, 1957) is an American attorney and politician. She served as a Democratic member of the Illinois House of Representatives, representing the 57th District from 2001 to 2017. She was formerly the Democratic Committeeman of Northfield Township, Illinois.

Prior to her election as representative of the 57th district, Nekritz was a member of the law firm of Altheimer and Gray, working as a real estate attorney and later becoming a partner with the firm. She also worked as legislative aide to Jeffrey Schoenberg, now the state senator for the 9th District, while he served as the state representative of the 58th District.

Nekritz was born and raised in Wichita, Kansas. She currently resides in Northbrook, Illinois, with her husband, Barry.

Issues 

Representative Nekritz co-sponsored SB-1; a plan that amended state employee pension plans by drastically reducing the constitutionally protected benefits of Illinois state employees in retirement. The Illinois Supreme Court ultimately found these legislative changes to be unconstitutional.

As the Illinois Supreme Court ruling stated: "These modifications to pension benefits unquestionably diminish the value of the retirement annuities the members…were promised when they joined the pension system. Accordingly, based on the plain language of the Act, these annuity-reducing provisions contravene the pension protection clause's absolute prohibition against diminishment of pension benefits and exceed the General Assembly's authority."

High-speed rail
Nekritz is the Chair of the Midwest Interstate Passenger Rail Commission and advocates building numerous high-speed rail lines in Illinois, including one from Chicago to Detroit. See written testimony before the Rail Subcommittee of the U.S. House Transportation & Infrastructure Committee April 20, 2010 (pdf).

Retirement Announced
On June 16, 2017, Nekritz announced that she will not be seeking re-election to her position. On October 3, 2017, Nekritz was replaced by Jonathan Carroll.

References

External links
Representative Elaine Nekritz (D) 57th District Illinois General Assembly
By session: 98th, 97th, 96th, 95th, 94th, 93rd
State Representative Elaine Nekritz constituency site
 
Rep. Elaine Nekritz at Illinois House Democrats
2012 candidate questionnaire at the Daily Herald (Arlington Heights)

Democratic Party members of the Illinois House of Representatives
Jewish American state legislators in Illinois
1957 births
Living people
Women state legislators in Illinois
University of Michigan Law School alumni
21st-century American Jews
21st-century American women